Tai Lei, also referred to as Tai Lei Chau, is a small island located off the island of Peng Chau in Hong Kong. The island is connected to Peng Chau by a bridge. The bridge leading to the island is a popular fishing spot for residents of Peng Chau.

Features
The island houses an electrical substation operated by China Light and Power. In 2010, renovation work conducted on the CLP facility on Tai Lei met resistance from local environmental organisations.

Part of the island is occupied by a refuse-sorting facility which handles much of the garbage generated by Peng Chau. The facility is connected to its own pier which allows material to be removed and taken to landfills by ship.

Transportation

The island is connected to Peng Chau by the Peng Lei Road bridge.

The southern end of the island has a public pier which is operated and maintained by the Civil Engineering and Development Department of the government.

See also

 List of islands and peninsulas of Hong Kong

References

Islands of Hong Kong
Uninhabited islands of Hong Kong